Ron Dean Howard (September 20, 1953 – July 20, 2021) was an American politician who served in the Kansas House of Representatives from the 98th district from 2019 to 2021.

He died on July 20, 2021, in Wichita, Kansas, at age 67.

References

1953 births
2021 deaths
Republican Party members of the Kansas House of Representatives
Politicians from Wichita, Kansas
21st-century American politicians